PPMD may refer to:

People 

 Kevin Nanney, an e-sports professional known by his gamer tag PPMD

Computer science 

 the compression algorithm PPMd, a variant of the Prediction by partial matching (PPM) compression technique